Helmond Sport is a professional association football club based in the city of Helmond, North Brabant, Netherlands, that competes in the Eerste Divisie, the second tier of the Dutch football league system. The club was founded on 27 June 1967, as a breakaway from the local professional club Helmondia '55, which had gone bankrupt.

History
The club was founded in 1967, after the professional license was taken over from RKSV Helmondia '55 in order to keep professional football in Helmond. Helmond Sport started in the Tweede Divisie. After only a year, the club was promoted to the First Division after winning the promotion matches against Fortuna Vlaardingen and SC Veendam. In 1982, the team were promoted to the Eredivisie. There, they would play for two seasons, before being relegated back to the Eerste Divisie. The first season back in the Eerste Divisie saw Helmond Sport reach the cup final, which was lost to FC Utrecht in injury time. Helmond Sport was close to promotion to the Eredivisie in the play-offs of the 2004–05 Eerste Divisie season. They came up 1–0 against Sparta due to a 59th minute Nyron Wau goal, but in the last 20 minutes Riga Mustapha (73') and Rachid Bouaouzan (90+1') scored 1–1 and 1–2 and Sparta was promoted instead.
In the 2010–11 season Helmond finished 3rd in the Eerste Divisie but were beaten in the play-off final for promotion to the Eredivisie.

Honours
KNVB Cup
 Runners-up: 1985
Eerste Divisie
 Winner: 1982
 Promoted to Eerste Divisie
 Promotion: 1968

Domestic results
Below is a table with Helmond Sport's domestic results since the introduction of professional football in 1956.

Current squad

Former players

  Jeremias Carlos David
  Remco Torken
  Ricky Bochem

Management

Former managers

 Frans Debruijn (1967–1968)
 Jacques de Wit (1968–1972)
 René van Eck (1972–1974)
 Co Prins (a.i.) (1974)
 Evert Mur (1974–75)
 Ron Dellow (1975–77)
 Harrie van Tuel (1977–1978)
 Jacques de Wit (1978–1979)
 Jan Notermans (1979–83)
 Jan Brouwer (1983–86)
 Jo Jansen (1986-87)
 Theo Laseroms (1987–88)
 Dick Buitelaar (1988–89)
 Frans Körver (1989–92)
 Henk Rayer (1992–93)
 Louis Coolen (a.i.) (1993)
 Adrie Koster (1993–95)
 Jan Pruijn (1995–96)
 Willem Leushuis (a.i.) (1996)
 Louis Coolen (1996–01)
 Mario Verlijsdonk (2001–02)
 Jan van Dijk (2002–04)
 Ruud Brood (2004–06)
 Gerald Vanenburg (2006–07)
 Mario Verlijsdonk (a.i.) (2007)
 Jan Poortvliet (2007–08)
 Jurgen Streppel (2008–11)
 Hans de Koning (2011–12)
 Eric Meijers (2012–13)
 Mario Verlijsdonk (a.i.) (2013)
 Jan van Dijk (2013–16)
 Remond Strijbosch (a.i.) (2016)
 Roy Hendriksen (2016–18)
 Rob Alflen (2018–19)

References

External links

Official website

 
Association football clubs established in 1967
1967 establishments in the Netherlands
Football clubs in the Netherlands
Football clubs in Helmond